Olé, Olé is the third studio album by Algerian singer Rachid Taha. It was released by Mango Records in 1995. It was reissued in 1996 by Barclay Records with an alternate track listing.  Valencia features the singing of Kirsty Hawkshaw.

Track listing

Personnel
 Rachid Taha - lead vocals, guitar 
 Steve Hillage - guitar, mixing, producer, programming, remixing 
 Aziz Ben Salam- flute sodi guitar, programming 
 Nabil Khalidi - banjo, bendir, lute, backing vocals
 Steve Conn – accordion, Dinesh percussion, tabla 
 Leo "E-Zee-Kill" Williams - bass
 Martin Ditcham - percussion, tambourine 
 Geoffrey Richardson - viola, violin 
 Geoff Dugmore - drums
 Hagag Kenway - percussion 
 Helen Liebmann - cello 
 John Eacott - trumpet 
Jim Abbiss - engineer, keyboards, mixing, producer 
 Yves Aouizerate - arranger, programming 
 Kirsty Hawkshaw - vocals, backing vocals 
 Dave Watts - vocals

Source:

References

External links
Official website

1995 albums
Albums produced by Steve Hillage
Rachid Taha albums
Mango Records albums